Established in 1997, Ethos Books is an independent book publisher based in Singapore. It is an imprint of Pagesetters Services Pte Ltd, a communications and design house. Ethos Books specialises in publishing literary works of fiction, non-fiction and poetry primarily from writers in Singapore. It has published several award-winning poetry volumes and anthologies by authors such as Felix Cheong, Alvin Pang, Alfian Sa'at, Cyril Wong and Daren Shiau. In recent years, it has published critical works on Singapore studies by scholars and activists such as Cherian George, Loh Kah Seng, Kevin YL Tan, Thum Ping Tjin, and Teo You Yenn.

History 
In 1997, publisher Fong Hoe Fang founded Ethos Books, an imprint of Pagesetters Services, an advertising and communication design agency, to lend voice to diverse and emerging writers and to help foster a thriving literary culture. He launched it with a trio of titles by newcomers – namely Aaron Lee's A Visitation of Sunlight, Alvin Pang's Testing the Silence and David Leo's One Journey, Many Rivers.

References

External links
 Official website

Book publishing companies of Singapore
Publishing companies established in 1997